Crossroads is a 2002 American teen drama road film directed by Tamra Davis, from a screenplay by Shonda Rhimes. It stars Britney Spears, Anson Mount, Zoe Saldana, Taryn Manning, Kim Cattrall and Dan Aykroyd. Set in Georgia, it centers on three teenage girls on a cross-country road trip, as they find themselves and their friendship in the process.

Development began in 2001 when Spears created a concept that was later expanded by Rhimes. Principal filming began in March 2001, and encompassed over six months. Produced by MTV Films and released on February 15, 2002, in North America by Paramount Pictures, Crossroads was a box office success, grossing $61 million worldwide on a $12 million budget. It received generally unfavorable reviews, but Spears' performance was praised.

Plot
As children growing up in a small Georgia town, Lucy, Kit, and Mimi bury a "wish box" and vow to dig it up on the night of their high school graduation. However, as the trio grows up, their friendship fades: Lucy becomes the introverted valedictorian, Kit becomes the most popular girl in school, and Mimi becomes an outcast from the trailer park facing teenage pregnancy.

On the night of graduation, they reunite to dig up the "wish box", remembering their old wishes: Kit wanted to get married, Lucy wanted to find her mother who abandoned her, and Mimi wanted to travel to California. Lucy and Kit try to convince Mimi, who is five months pregnant, not to go to Los Angeles to audition for a record company. However, they decide to go with her to Los Angeles the next morning. Kit is going to see her fiancé who is a student at UCLA, and Lucy is going to find her mother in Tucson, Arizona.

Unbeknownst to her overbearing father Pete, Lucy, Kit, and Mimi depart in a yellow 1973 Buick Skylark convertible with Mimi’s friend Ben. During the trip, the car breaks down in Louisiana and, with little money, Mimi suggests that they sing karaoke at a New Orleans bar for tips. At the bar, Mimi develops stage fright and is unable to sing. Lucy takes her place and is a hit, and the girls earn enough money to fix the car and continue on their way.

While staying at a motel in Alabama, Kit tells Lucy and Mimi that she heard a rumor about Ben going to jail for killing a guy. Uneasy for most of the trip, the girls finally confront Ben about the rumor, who reveals that he actually went to jail for driving his stepsister across state lines without parental consent because his stepfather was abusing her. Lucy and Ben fall in love with each other, and the girls have their first honest conversation since they were children: Lucy reveals that her mother left her and her father when she was three years old, but believes that her mother wants to see her again; Kit, who was overweight as a child, reveals that her mother sent her to "fat camp" every summer until she reached her goal weight, but now hates that Kit is prettier than her; Mimi reveals that her baby's father is not her ex-boyfriend Kurt, but a man who raped her at a party, and that she is planning to put her baby up for adoption.

In Tucson, Lucy finds her mother Caroline, who has remarried with two young sons and is unhappy to see her. Caroline reveals that Lucy was an unintended pregnancy and that she wants nothing to do with her, leaving Lucy heartbroken. At the motel, Ben consoles Lucy and impresses her by writing music to a poem she has written during the trip. Lucy then rejoins Kit, Mimi, and Ben, and they reach Los Angeles.

One night, Kit takes Mimi with her to surprise her fiancé Dylan. Alone together in the motel, Lucy loses her virginity to Ben. Kit and Mimi arrive at Dylan's apartment to find him cheating on Kit with another woman. She then realizes that it was Dylan who raped Mimi, and punches him in the face. While running away, Mimi falls down the stairs and loses her baby. In the hospital, Lucy and Kit console her as she comes to terms with her loss, having decided to keep her baby once they reached Los Angeles.

Lucy calls her father to come take her, Kit, and Mimi back home, and Kit and Mimi tell her that she should go to the audition in Mimi's place. Lucy declines and prepares to leave with them and her father, but realizes that everything she has done has been to please her father instead of herself. Lucy tells her father to let her go, runs to Ben, and they kiss. She, Kit, and Mimi head to the audition with Ben and receive a standing ovation for their performance of her song, "I'm Not a Girl, Not Yet a Woman".

The girls re-bury the "wish box" at a Los Angeles beach, deciding not to make any wishes for the future, but to focus on the present and their friendship.

Cast

Production
In early 2001, Spears said that she had plans to make her film debut. She and her team then created a concept for it, which was later developed by Grey's Anatomy creator Shonda Rhimes. Spears commented that she "talked to [Rhimes] and told her what I wanted the movie to be about and she elaborated on it. It was my little project. When you do a movie, I think you have to be really passionate about it. I was having a lot of offers, but this is something my heart was into." A press conference was held during the Marché International du Disque et de l'Edition Musicale (MIDEM) in Cannes, France, on January 19, 2002, where Spears also premiered the film.

Filming for Crossroads initiated in March 2001 in New Orleans, Metairie, Baton Rouge, and Tangipahoa Parish, Louisiana, near Spears' hometown. Due to the fact that Spears was also recording her third studio album along with the film's production, filming wrapped up after only six months. Additional scenes were filmed in Los Angeles County, California. Crossroads had a total budget of $12 million; a relatively low budget by industry standards. According to the Louisiana Film and Video Commission, the film was originally titled What Friends are For. Spears described it as a teen movie that deals with real issues that normal teenagers live on a daily basis. She continued to explain the film's content, saying that it "is about this journey that the three of us best friends take, finding ourselves and what we want out of life and getting our friendship back. Friends are all you have at the end of the day. When your boyfriend breaks up with you, who do you call? Your girlfriend. I just love that message."

Justin Long, who plays one of Lucy's best friends from high school, thought that Crossroads is "like a road trip buddy movie for girls." Long also said that he was impressed by Spears' work ethic, commenting that "she could not have been more down to earth. She's the sweetest girl. After 10 minutes, I forgot she was a big pop star." Anson Mount revealed that before he took the role of Ben, he was on the set of the film City by the Sea with actor Robert De Niro. De Niro saw Mount with the Crossroads script and encouraged Mount to take the role, running a few of Spears' lines with him.

Reception

Box office 
Crossroads was released in the United States on February 15, 2002. On its opening day, Crossroads grossed an estimated $5.2 million in 2,380 theaters, becoming the second highest-grossing film of the day. On the first weekend of its release, Crossroads placed second, grossing an estimate of $14,527,187. By the second week, the film dropped a 52% on tickets sales, ranking at number 5 on the Box Office. Crossroads was a moderate financial success, grossing a total $37,191,304 in the United States. Worldwide, the film grossed a total of $61,141,030 until its close day, on May 9, 2002.

Critical response 

On Rotten Tomatoes, the film has a 15% approval rating based on 103 reviews, with an average rating of 4.10/10, with the consensus: "A cliched and silly pop star vanity project, Crossroads is strictly for Britney fans only." Metacritic, which assigns a weighted average score, gave the film a 27 out of 100 based on 31 reviews from critics, indicating "generally unfavorable reviews." Audiences surveyed by CinemaScore gave the film a grade "B" on scale of A to F.

John Anderson of Los Angeles Times commented "Spears acquits herself as well as anyone might, in a movie as contrived and lazy as this one". Chris Kaltenbach of The Baltimore Sun said, "go see Crossroads if you want to hear Britney sing or see her wear next-to-nothing. But otherwise, avoid this train wreck at all costs". Lisa Schwarzbaum of Entertainment Weekly gave the film a positive review, commenting Crossroads "not only makes excellent use of the singer's sweetly coltish acting abilities, but it also promotes a standardized set of sturdy values with none of Mariah Carey's desperate Glitter, or any of Mandy Moore's gummy pap in A Walk to Remember". Jane Crowther of BBC rated the film 3 out of 5 stars, applauded Cattrall and Aykroyd's interactions with the characters, and said that "Spears manages to come across on film as natural, endearing, and extremely likable".

Robert K. Elder of the Chicago Tribune said "Spears delivers a performance with the same sincerity she invests into a Pepsi commercial, only this film contains twice the sugary calories", while New York Daily News writer Elizabeth Weitzman noted, "Here's what Crossroads does not have: Cohesive direction from Tamra Davis, intelligent dialogue, a comprehensible plot". Maitland McDonagh of TV Guide commented that "the film's mealy-mouthed messages about feminine empowerment will almost certainly fall on deaf ears, since even 11-year-olds know Spears's power resides largely in her taut torso". Claudia Puig of USA Today considered it "less a movie than a mind-numbingly dull road trip", while The Washington Post reporter Ann Hornaday said, "not a music video, not yet a movie, but more like an extended-play advertisement for the Product that is Britney".

Jane Dark of Village Voice compared Crossroads to Mariah Carey's Glitter, saying, "you spend a lot of time wondering, 'Better or worse than Glitter?' You think if the projectionist cranked the volume a little you could actually sort of get into this".

In 2010, Time named it one of the top 10 worst chick flicks.

In 2021, Pamela Hutchinson wrote a critical reassessment in The Guardian, noting that contemporary "negative reviews recoiled at the film's savvy as a star vehicle – the way it builds up and reinforces Spears's commercial persona, from her virginity to her work ethic." Hutchinson argued "Crossroads was designed to represent what Britney Spears meant to her young fans, a hand to hold through the minefield of growing up. That's why her endearing earnestness shines through every deliberately unironic scene."

Accolades

Home media
Crossroads was released on VHS and DVD on July 23, 2002. The film has yet to be released as a Blu-ray version or to be made available on video streaming services.

Soundtrack

Background
Spears had initially recorded "Overprotected", "I'm Not a Girl, Not Yet a Woman", "Bombastic Love" and a cover of "I Love Rock 'n' Roll" for Crossroads; the songs were later included on the singer's third studio album, Britney (2001). The soundtrack album features tracks by Spears, Mystikal, Matthew Sweet, Jars of Clay and Bowling for Soup. Crossroads (Music from the Major Motion Picture) was released by Zomba Records on February 2, 2002, and was produced by Rodney Jerkins, The Neptunes, Fred Maher, Matthew Sweet, Dennis Herring, Jaret Reddick, Max Martin, and Rami Yacoub. "Overprotected" was remixed by JS16 for the soundtrack album.

Track listing

Credits and personnel
 Performers – Britney Spears, Mystikal, Matthew Sweet, Jars of Clay, Bowling for Soup
 Songwriters – Alan Merrill, Jake Hooker, Michael Tyler, Pharrell Williams, Chad Hugo, Matthew Sweet, Jars of Clay, Jaret Reddick, Max Martin, Rami Yacoub
 Producers – Rodney Jerkins, The Neptunes, Fred Maher, Matthew Sweet, Dennis Herring, Jaret Reddick, Max Martin, Rami Yacoub
 Remixer – JS16
 Audio mastering – Tom Coyne

Bibliography

References

External links
 
 
 Crossroads at AllMovie

2002 films
2000s buddy comedy-drama films
2000s road comedy-drama films
2000s pregnancy films
2000s teen comedy-drama films
2000s coming-of-age comedy-drama films
American buddy comedy-drama films
American coming-of-age comedy-drama films
American female buddy films
American road comedy-drama films
American teen comedy-drama films
MTV Films films
Films directed by Tamra Davis
Paramount Pictures films
Films shot in Los Angeles County, California
Films shot in New Orleans
Films about rape in the United States
Golden Raspberry Award winning films
Teenage pregnancy in film
Films scored by Trevor Jones
2002 comedy films
2000s female buddy films
2000s English-language films
2000s American films